Sigþrúður Friðriksdóttir (1830 – 1912) was an Icelandic women's rights activist.  

She was married to the high judge Jón Pétursson.

She was one of the co-founders of the women's organization Hið íslenska kvenfélag, which was founded in 1894, and served as its first president in 1894–1897. She was succeeded by Þorbjörg Sveinsdóttir.

References 

1830 births
1912 deaths
19th-century Icelandic people
19th-century Icelandic women
Icelandic feminists
Icelandic women's rights activists